Dovercourt is a town in England.

Dovercourt may also refer to:
Dovercourt, Alberta, a locality
Dovercourt, Edmonton, Canada, a residential neighbourhood
Dovercourt (provincial electoral district), in Canada

See also
Dovercourt Park